Dariusz Zjawiński (born 19 August 1986) is a Polish professional footballer who plays as a forward for Legionovia Legionowo.

External links 
 
 

1986 births
Living people
People from Pruszków
Sportspeople from Masovian Voivodeship
Polish footballers
Association football forwards
Legionovia Legionowo players
Legia Warsaw players
Odra Wodzisław Śląski players
Świt Nowy Dwór Mazowiecki players
Ząbkovia Ząbki players
MKS Cracovia (football) players
Arka Gdynia players
MKP Pogoń Siedlce players
Znicz Pruszków players
Ekstraklasa players
I liga players
II liga players
III liga players